R. ferruginea may refer to:
 Rhagoletis ferruginea, a fruit fly species
 Rollinia ferruginea, a plant species endemic to Brazil
 Rusina ferruginea, the brown rustic, a moth species found in Europe

See also
 Ferruginea (disambiguation)